Leslie Cliff may refer to:

Leslie Cliff (swimmer) (born 1955), retired Canadian swimmer
Leslie Cliff (figure skater) (1908–1969), British pair skater